Zuhur Dixon (1933 – 22 March 2021) was an Iraqi poet.

Biography
She was born in 1933 in Abu Al-Khaseeb. Dixon later moved to Baghdad with her husband. Her writing deals with the role of women in a very traditional society.

Her work was included in the anthologies Modern Arabic Poetry: An Anthology and This Same Sky: A Collection of Poems from Around the World.

Dixon died on 22 March 2021, aged 88.

Works 
Selected works:
 Cities have another awakening, poetry (1976)
 A Homeland for Everything, poetry (1979)

References 

1933 births
2021 deaths
Iraqi women writers
Iraqi writers
Iraqi women poets
20th-century Iraqi poets
20th-century Iraqi women writers
20th-century Iraqi writers
21st-century Iraqi poets
21st-century Iraqi women writers
21st-century Iraqi writers
People from Basra Province
Writers from Baghdad